Stanford I. Lehr (May 13, 1912 – October 30, 1992) was a Republican member of the Pennsylvania House of Representatives.

References

Republican Party members of the Pennsylvania House of Representatives
1912 births
1992 deaths
20th-century American politicians